was a Japanese statesman, courtier and politician during the Heian period.

Career
He was a minister during the reign of Emperor Reizei.

 968 (Kōhō 5, 12th month): Morotada is named udaijin.
 969 (Anna 2, 3rd month): Morotada is elevated to the position of sadaijin in the Imperial court.
 969 (Anna 2, 10th month): Sadaijin Morotada died.

Genealogy
This member of the Fujiwara clan was the son of Fujiwara no Tadahira. Morotada was the youngest son.   He had two brothers:  Saneyori and Morosuke.

Notes

References
 Brinkley, Frank and Dairoku Kikuchi. (1915). A History of the Japanese People from the Earliest Times to the End of the Meiji Era. New York: Encyclopædia Britannica. OCLC 413099
 Titsingh, Isaac. (1834).  Annales des empereurs du Japon (Nihon Odai Ichiran).  Paris: Royal Asiatic Society, Oriental Translation Fund of Great Britain and Ireland. OCLC 5850691 

920 births
969 deaths
Fujiwara clan
Regents of Japan